The 1976 Colorado State Rams football team was an American football team that represented Colorado State University in the Western Athletic Conference (WAC) during the 1976 NCAA Division I football season. In its fourth season under head coach Sark Arslanian, the team compiled a 6–5 record (2–4 against WAC opponents). Colorado State's junior quarterback, Dan Graham, passed for 816 yards, 2 touchdown's and 5 interceptions.

Schedule

Team players in the NFL

References 

Colorado State
Colorado State Rams football seasons
Colorado State Rams football